Leslie Cheetham (8 October 1925 – May 1998) was a British wrestler. He competed in the men's freestyle flyweight at the 1952 Summer Olympics.

References

1925 births
1998 deaths
British male sport wrestlers
Olympic wrestlers of Great Britain
Wrestlers at the 1952 Summer Olympics
Sportspeople from Bolton